Jin Jianxiao (1910 – 1936) was the penname of one Manchurian poet.


Biography
Jin Jianxiao was born on December in 1910 at Fengtian city. His name is Jin Chengzai (金承載), courtesy name Peizhi (培之), pseudonym Mengchen (夢塵), penname Jianxiao (劍嘯), Jianshuo (健碩), Balai (巴來).

See also

References

External links
 金劍嘯塑像圖片
 金劍嘯烈士像前的追思
 紀念抗日烈士金劍嘯殉國79週年

1910 births
1936 deaths
People of Manchukuo
Manchu people
Manchu literature
Poets from Liaoning